The following outline is provided as an overview of and topical guide to Nova Scotia:

Nova Scotia – meaning New Scotland in Latin, is the second-smallest province in Canada. It is one of Canada's three Maritime provinces, with its mainland territory consisting of the Nova Scotia peninsula surrounded by the Atlantic Ocean, in addition to over 3,800 coastal islands, the largest one being Cape Breton Island.

General reference 
 Pronunciation: ; ; 
 Common English name(s): Nova Scotia
 Official English name: Nova Scotia
 Common endonym(s):  
 Official endonym(s): Nova Scotia, 
 Adjectival(s): Nova Scotian
 Demonym(s): Nova Scotian, Bluenose, Bluenoser
 Bibliography of Nova Scotia

Geography of Nova Scotia 

Geography of Nova Scotia
 Nova Scotia is: a Maritime Province of Canada
 Location:
 The regions that Nova Scotia is in are:
 Northern Hemisphere, Western Hemisphere
 Americas
 North America
 Northern America
 Canada
 Eastern Canada
 Atlantic Canada
 The Maritimes
 Extreme points of Nova Scotia
 Highest point of Nova Scotia: White Hill
 Population of Nova Scotia: 921,727 (2011 census)
 Area of Nova Scotia: 55,283 km²
 Atlas of Nova Scotia

Environment of Nova Scotia 
 Geology of Nova Scotia
 Protected areas of Nova Scotia
World Heritage Sites of Nova Scotia:
Joggins Fossil Cliffs
 Grand-Pré National Historic Site
Old Town Lunenburg
 Historic places in Nova Scotia
 National Historic Sites of Canada in Nova Scotia

Natural geographic features of Nova Scotia 
 Bodies of water
 Adjacent bodies of water
 Atlantic Ocean
 Bay of Fundy
 Northumberland Strait
 Strait of Canso
 Interior bodies of water
 Lakes of Nova Scotia
 Lakes named Rocky Lake in Nova Scotia
 Rivers of Nova Scotia
 Waterfalls of Nova Scotia
 Islands of Nova Scotia
Cape Breton Island
Brier Island
Sable Island
 Mountains of Nova Scotia
 Mountain ranges of Nova Scotia
 Cape Breton Highlands
 Cobequid Mountains
Annapolis Valley
Musquodoboit Valley
Shubenacadie Valley
Stewiacke Valley
Wentworth Valley

Regions of Nova Scotia 

 Mainland Halifax
 Isthmus of Chignecto
Tantramar
 Nova Scotia peninsula
 Annapolis Valley
Central Nova Scotia
 Eastern Shore
 Halifax Regional Municipality
Musquodoboit Valley
 North Shore (Nova Scotia)
 Southern Nova Scotia
 Cape Breton Island
 Industrial Cape Breton
 Cape Breton Regional Municipality (CBRM)
 Cape Breton Highlands
 Strait of Canso Area

Administrative divisions of Nova Scotia 

 Capital of Nova Scotia: Halifax Regional Municipality
 Population centres in Nova Scotia
 Health regions of Nova Scotia
 Counties of Nova Scotia
 School districts in Nova Scotia

Counties of Nova Scotia 
Nova Scotia has 18 counties, 3 of which are regional municipalities.

 Annapolis
 Antigonish
 Cape Breton
 Colchester
 Cumberland
 Digby
 Guysborough
 Halifax
 Hants
 Inverness
 Kings
 Lunenburg
 Pictou
 Queens
 Richmond
 Shelburne
 Victoria
 Yarmouth

Regional municipalities of Nova Scotia 
Nova Scotia has 3 regional municipalities.

Regional municipalities
 Cape Breton
 Halifax – Capital of Nova Scotia
 Queens

Halifax Regional Municipality 
Halifax Regional Municipality – Capital of Nova Scotia
 Geography of the Halifax Regional Municipality
 Halifax Harbour
 Municipal Districts
 Communities in the Halifax Regional Municipality
 Bedford
 Chebucto Peninsula
 Cole Harbour & Westphal
 Cow Bay & Eastern Passage
 Dartmouth
 Eastern Shore East
 Eastern Shore West
 Hammonds Plains, Upper Sackville & Beaver Bank
 Lake Echo & Porters Lake
 Lawrencetown
 Musquodoboit Valley & Dutch Settlement
 Preston & Cherrybrook
 Prospect
 St. Margaret's Bay
 Timberlea, Lakeside, Beechville
 Government and politics of Halifax
 Regional Council
 Community Councils
 Halifax elections
 2004 election
 2008 election 
 2012 election
 Law of Halifax
 Law enforcement in Halifax
 Halifax Regional Police
 History of the Halifax Regional Municipality
 Halifax Explosion
 Culture of the Halifax Regional Municipality
 Architecture of Halifax
 Buildings and infrastructure
 People from Halifax
 Sports in the Halifax Regional Municipality
 Economy and infrastructure of the Halifax Regional Municipality
 Communications in Halifax
 Media in the Halifax Regional Municipality
 Halifax Public Libraries
 Halifax Regional Fire and Emergency
 Transportation in the Halifax Regional Municipality
 Metro Transit  
 Halifax Port Authority
 Halifax Harbour Solutions
 Royal Nova Scotia Yacht Squadron
 Water supply and sanitation in Halifax
 Halifax Regional Water Commission
 Education in the Halifax Regional Municipality
 Halifax Regional School Board

Municipal districts of Nova Scotia 
Municipal districts
 Argyle
 Barrington
 Chester
 Clare
 Digby
 East Hants
 Guysborough
 Lunenburg
 Shelburne
 St. Mary's
 West Hants
 Yarmouth

Towns of Nova Scotia 
 Amherst
 Annapolis Royal
 Antigonish
 Berwick
 Bridgetown
 Bridgewater
 Clark's Harbour
 Digby
 Hantsport
 Kentville
 Lockeport
 Lunenburg
 Mahone Bay
 Middleton
 Mulgrave
 New Glasgow
 Oxford
 Parrsboro
 Pictou
 Port Hawkesbury
 Shelburne
 Springhill
 Stellarton
 Stewiacke
 Trenton
 Truro
 Westville
 Windsor
 Wolfville
 Yarmouth

Incorporated villages 
 Aylesford
 Baddeck
 Bible Hill
 Canning
 Chester
 Cornwallis Square
 Dover
 Freeport
 Greenwood
 Havre Boucher
 Hebbville
 Kingston
Lawrencetown
 New Minas
 Port Williams
 Pugwash
 River Hebert
 St. Peter's
 Tatamagouche
 Tiverton
 Westport
 Weymouth

Communities of Nova Scotia, by county 
Communities in Nova Scotia
 Lists of communities by county
 List of communities in Annapolis County, Nova Scotia
 List of communities in Antigonish County, Nova Scotia
 List of communities in Digby County, Nova Scotia
 List of communities in Guysborough County, Nova Scotia
 List of communities in Hants County, Nova Scotia
 List of communities in Inverness County, Nova Scotia
 List of communities in Kings County, Nova Scotia
 List of communities in Lunenburg County, Nova Scotia
 List of communities in Pictou County, Nova Scotia
 List of communities in Region of Queens Municipality, Nova Scotia
 List of communities in Richmond County, Nova Scotia
 List of communities in Shelburne County, Nova Scotia
 List of communities in Victoria County, Nova Scotia
 Designated places in Nova Scotia
 List of towns in Nova Scotia
 Victoria
 List of villages in Nova Scotia
 Old Acadian Villages of Nova Scotia
 Indian reserves in Nova Scotia

Demographics of Nova Scotia 

Demographics of Nova Scotia
 Population centres in Nova Scotia

Government and politics of Nova Scotia 

 Form of government: Constitutional monarchy
 Capital of Nova Scotia: Halifax Regional Municipality
 Elections in Nova Scotia
 Canadian federal election results in Nova Scotia
 Political issues in Nova Scotia
 NIMBY in Nova Scotia
 Political parties in Nova Scotia
 The three main political parties are:
 Progressive Conservative Party of Nova Scotia
 Nova Scotia Liberal Party
 Nova Scotia New Democratic Party
 Political scandals of Nova Scotia
 Taxation in Canada

Federal representation 
 Senators

Provincial government of Nova Scotia

Executive branch

 Head of state: King in Right of Nova Scotia, King of Canada, King Charles III
 Head of state's representative (Viceroy): Lieutenant Governor of Nova Scotia
 List of lieutenant governors of Nova Scotia
 Head of government: Premier of Nova Scotia
 List of premiers of Nova Scotia
 Deputy Premier of Nova Scotia
 Cabinet: Executive Council of Nova Scotia
 Head of council: Lieutenant-Governor-in-Council, as representative of the King in Right of Nova Scotia
 Nova Scotia Government Agencies and Crown Corporations

Legislative branch

 Parliament of Nova Scotia (unicameral, which nonetheless has 2 components):
 King-in-Parliament (King of Canada), represented in his absence by the Lieutenant-Governor of Nova Scotia
 Nova Scotia House of Assembly
 List of Nova Scotia General Assemblies
 Speaker of the House of Assembly of Nova Scotia
 List of Nova Scotia opposition leaders

Judicial branch

Court system of Nova Scotia
 Nova Scotia Court of Appeal (NSCA)
 Nova Scotia Supreme Court
 Provincial Court of Nova Scotia

Law and order in Nova Scotia 

 Capital punishment in Nova Scotia: none.
 Nova Scotia, as with all of Canada, does not have capital punishment.
 Canada eliminated the death penalty for murder on July 14, 1976.
 Constitution of Canada
 Constitution Act, 1867 – sets the powers and structure of the provinces of Canada, including Nova Scotia
 Criminal justice system of Nova Scotia
 Criminal Code of Canada
 Human rights in Nova Scotia
 Domestic partnership in Nova Scotia
 Same-sex marriage in Nova Scotia

Law enforcement in Nova Scotia 

 Provincial Court of Nova Scotia
 Halifax Regional Police

Military in Nova Scotia 

 CFB Halifax
 CFB Greenwood

History of Nova Scotia 

History of Nova Scotia

History of Nova Scotia, by period 
 Part of Mi'kmaq semi-nomadic tribal lands (Mi'kmaq'ki) (centuries prior-1604)
 Part of Acadia (1604-1710) – still considered "Mi'kmaq'ki" by the Mi'kmaq, who allowed French settlement in their midst
 Habitation at Port-Royal (1605-1613)
 Scottish Colony "Nova Scotia" 1629-1632
 Part of Acadia again (1632-1710)
 Port-Royal (relocated) (1632-1710)
 Acadian Civil War (1640-1644)
 Wabanaki Confederacy (1675–present)
 Siege of Port Royal (Conquest of Acadia, 1710)
 Treaty of Utrecht (1713) – France ceded Nova Scotia to Great Britain
 
 Father Rale's War (1722–1725)
 Acadian Exodus (1749)
 Father Le Loutre's War (1749–1755)
 Expulsion of the Acadians (1755–1764)
 Old Acadian Villages of Nova Scotia
 Burying the Hatchet ceremony (1761)
 Treaty of Paris (1763) – France ceded New France, including Nova Scotia/Acadia to Great Britain
 Canadian Confederation (1867) – Dominion of Canada formed, establishing provinces of Ontario, Quebec, Nova Scotia, and New Brunswick

History of Nova Scotia, by region 

 History of the Halifax Regional Municipality
 Amalgamation of the Halifax Regional Municipality
 Halifax (former city)
 Halifax Explosion
 History of Victoria

History of Nova Scotia, by subject 

 Historic places in Nova Scotia
 Ghost towns in Nova Scotia
 Maritime history of Nova Scotia
 Bluenose
 Bluenose II
 Bluenose IV
 Maritime Sign Language

Military history of Nova Scotia 

Military history of Nova Scotia
 Battle of Port Royal (1690)
 Conquest of Acadia (1710)
 Battle of Jeddore Harbour (1722)
 Northeast Coast Campaign (1745)
 Battle of Grand Pré (1747)
 Dartmouth Massacre (1751)
 Bay of Fundy Campaign (1755)
 Fall of Louisbourg (1758)
 Headquarters established for Royal Navy's North American Station (1758)
 Burying the Hatchet ceremony (1761)
 Battle of Fort Cumberland (1776)
 Raid on Lunenburg (1782)
 Halifax Impressment Riot (1805)
 Establishment of New Ireland (1812)
 Capture of USS Chesapeake (1813)
 Battle at the Great Redan (1855)
 Siege of Lucknow (1857)
 CSS Tallahassee Escape (1861)
 Departing Halifax for Northwest Rebellion (1885)
 Departing Halifax for the Boer War (1899)
 Imprisonment of Leon Trotsky (1917)
 Jewish Legion formed (1917)
 Battle of the St. Lawrence (
 Sinking of the SS Point Pleasant Park (1945)
 Halifax VE-Day Riot (1945)
 Walter Callow Wheelchair Bus established (1947)

Culture of Nova Scotia 

 Architecture of Nova Scotia
 Heritage Trust of Nova Scotia
 Province House
 Cuisine of Nova Scotia
 Nova Scotia wine
 Language in Nova Scotia
Canadian English dialect
 Acadian French dialect
Cape Breton accent
Mi'kmaq language
Language policies of Nova Scotia
 Museums of Nova Scotia
 Order of Nova Scotia
 People of Nova Scotia
 Nova Scotians
 Ethnic minorities in Nova Scotia
 Acadians
 Indigenous peoples
 Mi'kmaq people
 Black Nova Scotians
 Nobility in Nova Scotia
 Baronetcies in the Baronetage of Nova Scotia
 Public holidays in Nova Scotia
Treaty Day
Nova Scotia Heritage Day
 Religion in Nova Scotia
 Christianity in Nova Scotia
 Anglicanism in Nova Scotia
 Diocese of Nova Scotia and Prince Edward Island
 Symbols of Nova Scotia
 Coat of arms of Nova Scotia
 Flag of Nova Scotia
 Scouting and Guiding in Nova Scotia

Heritage sites in Nova Scotia 
 Historic places in Nova Scotia
 World Heritage Sites of Nova Scotia:
Joggins Fossil Cliffs
 Grand-Pré National Historic Site
Old Town Lunenburg
 National Historic Sites of Canada in Nova Scotia

The Arts in Nova Scotia 
 Art Gallery of Nova Scotia
 Literature of Nova Scotia
 First Death in Nova Scotia
 Music of Nova Scotia

Sports in Nova Scotia 

 List of ice hockey teams in Nova Scotia
 Nova Scotia Rugby Union

Economy and infrastructure of Nova Scotia 

 Economic rank (by nominal GDP):
 Banking in Nova Scotia
 Banks and credit unions in Canada
 Communications in Nova Scotia
 Radio stations in Nova Scotia
 Television stations in Nova Scotia
 Postage stamps and postal history of Nova Scotia
 Currency of Nova Scotia
 Energy in Nova Scotia
 List of electrical generating stations in Nova Scotia
 Petroleum pricing in Nova Scotia
 Mines in Nova Scotia
 Transportation in Nova Scotia
 Air transport in Nova Scotia
 Airlines in Nova Scotia
 Airports in Nova Scotia
 Roads in Nova Scotia
 Provincial highways of Nova Scotia
 Vehicle registration plates of Nova Scotia

Education in Nova Scotia 

 Primary education in Nova Scotia
 List of school districts in Nova Scotia
 List of schools in Nova Scotia
 Higher education in Nova Scotia
 Alliance of Nova Scotia Student Associations
 Colleges in Nova Scotia
 Universities in Nova Scotia
 Technical University of Nova Scotia

See also 

 Index of Nova Scotia–related articles
 Outline of geography
 Outline of Canada
 Outline of Alberta
 Outline of British Columbia
 Outline of Manitoba
 Outline of Ontario
 Outline of Prince Edward Island
 Outline of Quebec
 Outline of Saskatchewan

References

External links 

 Nova Scotia Govt online map archive

Nova Scotia
Nova Scotia